Richard James Milner, 3rd Baron Milner of Leeds (born 16 May 1959), is a British hereditary peer.

Biography
Milner is the only son of Michael Milner, 2nd Baron Milner of Leeds, he was educated at Charterhouse School and the University of Surrey (BSc). He succeeded to the peerage upon the death of his father in 2003.

Marriage and children
Milner married Margaret Christine Voisin on 25 June 1988. They have two daughters:

 Hon. Charlotte Emma Milner (born 8 May 1990)
 Hon. Nicola Louise Christine Milner (born 3 February 1992)

Lord Milner has no sons and there are no other heirs to the barony.

References

1959 births
Living people
People educated at Charterhouse School
Alumni of the University of Surrey
3